New Money may refer to:

Finance
Nouveau riche, a term for rich people who acquired their wealth within their own generations
Money creation, money introduced into the economy

Film and television
New Money (2017 film), an American film
New Money (2018 film), a Nigerian film
New Money (TV series), a 2015 American reality series
"New Money" (Deadwood), a 2005 TV episode

Music
New Money, a 2022 album by Logan Lynn
"New Money", a song by Calvin Harris from Funk Wav Bounces Vol. 2, 2022
"New Money", a song by Lil Twist, 2011
"New Money", a song by Royce da 5'9" from Street Hop, 2009
"New Money", a song by Trippie Redd from Trip at Knight, 2021